WDZD-LP is a low-power radio station broadcasting an oldies/beach music format. Licensed to Monroe, North Carolina, United States, in the eastern suburbs of Charlotte, the station is part of a non-profit organization, Shaggers, Inc.

References

External links

DZD-LP
DZD-LP
Radio stations established in 2014
2014 establishments in North Carolina